Sebastián Prieto may refer to:

 Sebastián Prieto (footballer) (born 1993), Argentine footballer
 Sebastian Prieto (handballer) (born 1987), British handball player
 Sebastián Prieto (tennis) (born 1975), Argentine tennis player